Shlomo Sand (pronounced Zand; ; born 10 September 1946) is an Israeli Emeritus Professor of History at Tel Aviv University.

Biography 
Sand was born in Linz, Austria, to Polish Jewish survivors of the Holocaust. His cultural background was grounded in Yiddish culture. His father, having taken an aversion to rabbis, abandoned his Talmudic studies at a yeshiva and dropped attendance at synagogues, after his mother was denied a front seat after her husband's death, and they could not afford the seat price. Both his parents had Communist and anti-imperialist views and refused to accept compensation from Germany for their suffering during the Second World War. Sand spent his first two years in a displaced persons camp near Munich, and moved with the family to Jaffa in 1948, where his father got a job as night porter in the headquarters of the local Communist party. He was expelled from high school at the age of sixteen, studied electronics by night and found employment by day in a radio repair business. Drafted in 1965, he served at the communist kibbutz of Yad Hanna. According to one interview, "Sand spent the late 1960s and early 1970s working a series of odd jobs, including several years as a telephone lineman." He completed his high-school work at age 25 and spent three years in the military. The Six-Day War, in which he served – his unit conquered at heavy loss the Abu Tor area in East Jerusalem – pushed him towards the radical left. After the war he served in Jericho, where, he says, Palestinians trying to return to the country were gunned down if they infiltrated at night, but were arrested if caught doing so by day. Such experiences, one incident in particular, left him with a sense that he had lost his homeland. Quitting the Union of Israeli Communist Youth (Banki), he joined the more radical, and anti-Zionist, Matzpen in 1968. He resigned from Matzpen in 1970 due to his disillusionment with the organisation.

Declining an offer by the Israeli Maki Communist Party to be sent to do cinema studies in Poland, Sand graduated with a BA in History from Tel Aviv University in 1975. Determined to "abandon everything" Israeli, he moved to France, where, from 1975 to 1985, after winning a scholarship, he studied and taught in Paris, receiving an MA in French History and a PhD for his thesis on Georges Sorel and Marxism. Since 1982, Sand has taught at Tel Aviv University as well as at the University of California, Berkeley, and the École des hautes études en sciences sociales in Paris.

In 1983, according to one source, Sand "took part in a heated exchange over Zeev Sternhell's Ni droite, ni gauche: l’idéologie fasciste en France, and later drew the ire of Claude Lanzmann with his 2002 book in Hebrew, Film as History, in which he not only passed scathing judgement on Lanzmann's Shoah, but also revealed that the film had been secretly funded by the Israeli government."

Views and opinions
While acknowledging "the affinity between Jews and the holy land," Sand has said that "I don't think the religious affinity to the land gives you historical right." Still, he supports Israel's existence "not because of historical right, but because of the fact that it exists today and any effort to destroy it will bring new tragedies." He explained that he doesn't call himself a Zionist, but "a post-Zionist and non-Zionist because the justification of this land is not historical right."

Comparing the Palestinians to children of rape, Sand has said that Israel "raped a population. And not only a population – we destroyed this society, in constituting the Israeli state." He opposes the Law of Return and the right of return. Still, "Israel has to be the state of Israelis. That is the only way we can continue to live in the Middle East." He argues that before Hitler, Jews were overwhelmingly against Zionism, and the concept of "Eretz Israel" was not about an earthly homeland but about something more spiritual. He also opposes the one-state solution because, while "very very popular in leftist circles," it is "not serious" because Israelis, being "one of the most racist societies in the western world," will never accept it. Thus he supports a "two state solution on the borders of ’67, taking out most of the settlers. I don’t think it will be a big problem." His position on the formation of a national identity extends to Palestinians, who did not, in his view, exist as a people before the rise of Zionism.

Criticism of gene studies 
Sand argues both against the notion of defining a nation based on genetic principles, and against the concrete results and reliability of genetic studies focusing on ethnic markers.

In 2010, when Harry Ostrer, a professor of genetics at the Albert Einstein College of Medicine, announced the results of a DNA study showing "powerful genetic markers of Jewish ancestry," Sand told Science Magazine that "Hitler would certainly have been very pleased." Writing in The Chronicle of Higher Education, Josh Fischman commented that Sand's argument in The Invention of the Jewish People that Jews arose from multiple conversions among various communities in Europe and elsewhere contradicted work by Harry Ostrer which argued that "geographically and culturally distant Jews still have more genes in common than they do with non-Jews around them," and that such genes were of Levantine origin," including the area where modern Israel is situated. Ostrer himself took offense at Sand's attack on his work: "Bringing up Hitler was overheated and misconstrues my work," he said. Sand reiterated his criticism, writing in an email to Fischman that "It is a shame for somebody who defines himself as a Jew to look for a Jewish gene."

Geneticist Dr. Eran Elhaik has published two research papers which cite Sand's work extensively. The first, "The Missing Link of Jewish European Ancestry: Contrasting the Rhineland and the Khazarian Hypotheses", came out in December 2012 argued that genetic evidence points to a "mosaic of Near Eastern-Caucasus, European, and Semitic ancestries" within the founding population of modern European Jews. The theory proved highly controversial, and was contested by a number of historians and several geneticists. Elhaik's second paper, in collaboration with others, similarly used Sand's work and concluded that the Ashkenazi descend from 'a heterogeneous Iranian population, which later mixed with Eastern and Western Slavs and possibly some Turks and Greeks in the territory of the Khazar Empire around the 8th century A.D.'

Published works

The Invention of the Jewish People 

Sand’s best-known book in English is The Invention of the Jewish People, originally published in Hebrew (Resling, 2008) as Matai ve’eich humtsa ha‘am hayehudi? (When and How Was the Jewish People Invented?) and translated into English the following year (Verso, 2009). It has generated a heated controversy.

Sand was criticized for presenting "dubious theories" regarding Jewish identity as historical facts. One provocative theory espoused by Sand, but challenged by other historians as "a myth with no factual basis," is the claim that Ashkenazi Jews are descended from Khazars, who purportedly converted in the early Middle Ages.

The book was in the best-seller list in Israel for nineteen weeks. It was reprinted three times when published in French (Comment le peuple juif fut inventé, Fayard, Paris, 2008). In France, it received the "Prix Aujourd'hui", a journalists' award given to a non-fiction political or historical work. An English translation of the book was published by Verso Books in October 2009. The book has also been translated into German, Italian, Spanish, Portuguese, Arabic, Russian, and Slovene and as of late 2009 further translations were underway. The Invention of the Jewish People has now been translated into more languages than any other Israeli history book.

The Invention of the Land of Israel 
In April 2012, a sequel, The Invention of the Land of Israel, was published in Hebrew by Kinneret Zmora-Bitan Dvir. It was published in English in 2013.

How I Stopped Being a Jew 
In 2013, Sand published How I Stopped Being a Jew which examines the question of Jewish identity and the distinction between being a Jew and being Israeli. It also examines the identity of Israel, with a focus on the country's relationship, as a "Jewish state," to Jews around the world and to its non-Jewish citizens. He expresses a desire to break with what he sees as a "tribal Judeocentrism" subject to the "caprices of the sleepwalking sorcerers of the tribe," expressing a deep attachment to the Hebrew language and to a secular ideal of Israel.

The End of the French Intellectual 
Sand's 2016 book La fin de l'intellectuel français? was published in English in 2018 as The End of the French Intellectual (with the question mark omitted). It is a critique of three contemporary French intellectuals, Michel Houellebecq, Éric Zemmour and Alain Finkielkraut.

Other publications 
 L'Illusion du politique, Paris, La Découverte, 1984 
 Intellectuals, Truth and Power: From the Dreyfus Affair to the Gulf War, Tel Aviv, Am Oved, 2000 (in Hebrew). 
 Le XXe siècle à l'écran, Paris, Seuil, 2004 (also in Hebrew and Spanish).
 Historians, Time and Imagination, Tel Aviv, Am Oved, 2004 (in Hebrew ).
 The Words and the Land, Los Angeles, Semiotext, 2011 (also in French).
 Twilight of History, London, Verso, 2017 (also in Hebrew and French).
 J. Julliard & S. Sand (eds.), Georges Sorel en son temps, Paris, Seuil, 1985 
 H. Bresheeth, M. Zimmerman & S. Sand (eds.), Cinema and Memory, Jerusalem, Zalman Shazar, 2004 (in Hebrew).
 S. Sand (ed.), Ernest Renan – On the Nation and the ‘Jewish People. London, Verso, 2010 (also in French and Hebrew).

References

External links 
 The Invention of the Jewish People, English Edition (Verso Books, 2009) Website
 Anita Shapira, Review Essay: The Jewish-people deniers, The Journal of Israeli History, Vol. 28, No. 1, March 2009, 63-72 (in English)
 "Comment le peuple juif fut inventé" ("How the Jewish People was invented") by Shlomo Sand, Le Monde diplomatique, August 2008
 Zionist nationalist myth of enforced exile: Israel deliberately forgets its history by Shlomo Sand, Le Monde diplomatique, September 2008
 Boycott Ariel college by Shlomo Sand, Haaretz
 "Are the Jews an invented people?", Eric Rouleau, Le Monde diplomatique - English edition (May 2008).

1946 births
Living people
Israeli historians
Historians of Jews and Judaism
Historians of France
Intellectual historians
Post-Zionists
Film theorists
Academic staff of Tel Aviv University
Tel Aviv University alumni
Israeli people of Austrian-Jewish descent
Israeli people of Polish-Jewish descent
Austrian people of Polish descent
People from Linz
Austrian emigrants to Israel